The Family of Man: Figure 2, Ancestor II, or simply Ancestor II, is a 1970 bronze sculpture by Barbara Hepworth, installed outside the Columbus Museum of Art, in Columbus, Ohio, United States. The approximately  sculpture has four cubes stacked on top of one another. The Smithsonian Institution describes the artwork as abstract and allegorical, representing family. It was gifted by Nationwide Mutual Insurance Company to commemorate the museum's 125th anniversary.

See also

 1970 in art

References

1970 sculptures
Abstract sculptures in the United States
Allegorical sculptures in the United States
Bronze sculptures in Ohio
Columbus Museum of Art
Outdoor sculptures in Columbus, Ohio
Sculptures by Barbara Hepworth